Glochidion temehaniense, also known by the synonym Phyllanthus temehaniensis, is a species of tree in the family Phyllanthaceae. It is endemic to the Society Islands of French Polynesia, where it is native to the islands of Tahaa, Raiatea, and Huahine. Like all other species of Glochidion, it is pollinated by leafflower moths in the genus Epicephala.

References

Flora of French Polynesia
temehaniense
Least concern plants
Taxonomy articles created by Polbot